The 1954 Colorado gubernatorial election was held on November 2, 1954. Democratic nominee Edwin C. Johnson defeated Republican nominee Donald G. Brotzman with 53.56% of the vote.

Primary elections
Primary elections were held on September 9, 1954.

Democratic primary

Candidates
Edwin C. Johnson, United States Senator

Results

Republican primary

Candidates
Donald G. Brotzman, State Senator

Results

General election

Candidates
Edwin C. Johnson, Democratic
Donald G. Brotzman, Republican

Results

References

1954
Colorado
Gubernatorial
November 1954 events in the United States